Kristian Seltun (born 1970) is a Norwegian dramaturge and theatre director.

He graduated as cand.philol. from the University of Bergen.

Seltun has been director at the theatres ,  (from 2001), and Trøndelag Teater (since 2010). He has been appointed theatre director for Nationaltheatret from 2021, succeeding Hanne Tømta.

References 

1970 births
Living people
University of Bergen alumni
Dramaturges
Norwegian theatre directors